The following is a list of the television networks and announcers who have broadcast college football's ReliaQuest Bowl throughout the years.

Television

Radio

References

Outback
Broadcasters
Outback Bowl
Outback Bowl
Outback Bowl
Outback Bowl